Enclothed cognition illustrates how clothing impacts human cognition based on the co-occurrence of its symbolic meaning and the physical wearing of the attire. The term was coined by Hajo Adam and Adam D. Galinsky who exhibited the phenomenon with an experiment in 2012 using white lab coats. They hypothesised that worn attire affects the wearer’s psychological processes due to the activation of abstract concepts through its symbolic meaning.

Procedure 
Prior to the experiment, a survey was carried out to see whether people associate attributes of attentiveness with white lab coats. The survey confirmed that participants linked attention-related characteristics to lab coats. Adam and Galinsky then hypothesised that the physical experience of wearing a lab coat and its symbolic meaning would enhance participant’s performance on tasks that required high levels of attention. To test this hypothesis, a total of three experiments were executed.

First experiment 
In their first experiment, 58 undergraduates with an average age of 20 were randomly assigned to two scenarios. Either wearing or not wearing a lab coat. Participants then completed a Stroop Test, where colour words are written in different colours, to measure selective attention. The first experiment consisted of 50 randomised trials with 20 being incongruent and 30 non-incongruent. Participants were asked to do this as fast as possible. This tested their selective attention abilities which is to concentrate on relevant stimuli while disregarding irrelevant stimuli. The results of this first experiment illustrated that participants wearing a lab coat made half as many errors than participants who wore their own clothing on incongruent trials. The amount of errors was the same in both groups on non-incongruent trials and there was no variation in the time completing the task in the different conditions. The experiment exhibited how physically wearing a lab coat can increase selective attention on a Stroop task.

Second experiment 
The second experiment assessed the symbolic meaning of clothing. This experiment’s aim was to demonstrate that both the physical wearing of clothing and its symbolic meaning are needed for enclothed cognition to appear. To convey this, different occupations were associated with the lab coats. One was a doctor’s coat and the other, a painter’s. The experiment tested sustained attention using a comparative visual search task. 74 undergraduates with an average age of 20 were randomly assigned to three different conditions in which one group wore a doctor’s coat, another a painter’s coat and one group wearing their own clothing while a doctor’s coat was displayed in front of them. Before the experiment, participants in all three scenarios were asked to answer questions regarding the lab coat (i.e., how they perceived the coat in the context of different occupations). During the experiment, participants were asked to do four comparative visual search tasks where they had to find four small differences in two almost identical images as fast as possible. The results saw more differences found by the group wearing a doctor’s coat, displaying greater sustained attention in comparison to the group wearing a painter’s coat and the group having a lab coat displayed in front of them. The time participants needed to complete the task did not vary. This showed that results were from increased sustained attention obtained wearing lab coats and not due to levels of effort.

Third experiment 
Experiment two brought into question whether wearing the lab coat really caused an increase in sustained attention or if the reason was through establishing a connection between oneself and the coat. This divided the concurrent hypothesis posed by Adam and Galinsky. Studies on behavioural priming propose that being exposed to a doctor’s coat should have resulted in increased sustained attention for group three similar to that of group one. Results of the second experiment indicated that sustained attention differed between the group wearing a doctor’s coat and the group having the coat displayed in front of them. The third group saw the doctor’s lab coat only when they entered the laboratory, but not during the rest of the experiment. Adam and Galinsky hypothesised that this absence of the priming effect may be due to the lack of exposure of the coat. As the physical wearing of clothing is a fundamental component in Adam and Galinsky’s hypothesis, they included an altered condition in the third experiment to demonstrate its significance. 99 undergraduate students participated and were randomly assigned to one of three scenarios of either wearing a doctor’s coat, a painter’s coat or writing about how they identified with the coat without wearing it. They were asked to repeat the same task from experiment 2 to examine their sustained attention. Results indicated that the group wearing a doctor’s lab coat found more differences than the group who wrote about the coat whilst the group wearing a painter’s coat performed worst. The result of the third experiment was the final evidence needed to effectively exhibit the enclothed cognition hypothesis.

Results 
Adam and Galinsky’s research on enclothed cognition illustrate the effects of the physical experience of wearing clothing as well as its symbolic meaning on the wearer’s psychological processes. The first experiment showed that participants wearing a lab coat had higher selective attention than people wearing their own clothing. The second and third experiment displayed strong evidence that enclothed cognition significantly depends on both wearing and the symbolic meaning of a piece of clothing. Sustained attention only increased when participants were told they were wearing a doctor’s coat. Therefore, Adam and Galinsky concluded that the principle of enclothed cognition relies on the co-occurrence of two independent variables, physically wearing clothing and its symbolic meaning.

References 

Cognition
Clothing